Zitha laminalis is a species of snout moth in the genus Zitha. It was described by Achille Guenée in 1854. It is found in South Africa.

References

Endemic moths of South Africa
Moths described in 1854
Pyralini